Nataliya Kazak (born 4 February 1960) is a Soviet rower. She competed in two events at the 1980 Summer Olympics.

References

1960 births
Living people
Soviet female rowers
Olympic rowers of the Soviet Union
Rowers at the 1980 Summer Olympics
Place of birth missing (living people)